The 2018 CS Asian Open Figure Skating Trophy was held from August 1, 2018 to August 5, 2018 in Bangkok, Thailand. It is part of the 2018–19 ISU Challenger Series. Medals were awarded in the disciplines of men's singles, ladies' singles, pair skating, and ice dancing.

Entries
The International Skating Union published the list of entries on July 25, 2018.

Changes to preliminary assignments

Results

Men

Ladies

Pairs 
Note: For this category, the 2018 Asian Open was considered as an International Competition only, since the minimum required number of entries for a Challenger Series event was not reached. In pairs skating, the minimum requirement for a Challenger Series event is five entries from at least three ISU Members.

Ice dancing

References

External links
 2018 CS Asian Figure Skating Trophy at the International Skating Union

CS Asian Open Trophy
2018 in Thai sport
2018